The FMA 20 El Boyero ("Shepherd") was a light utility aircraft produced in Argentina in the 1940s. It was a conventional high-wing strut-braced monoplane with fixed tailskid undercarriage with seating for two side by side in an enclosed cabin.

Development
The Fábrica Argentina de Aviones (FMA) began design work on the El Boyero in 1939, to meet the needs of Argentine flying clubs for a training aircraft. Two prototypes were built, with the first, powered by a  Continental A50 flat four engine, flying on 2 November 1940, and the second early the following year. The El Boyero was a single-engine tractor high-wing monoplane, with a fixed tailwheel undercarriage. Its fuselage had a steel tube structure with fabric covering, while the aircraft's wing, which was braced to the fuselage with steel tube struts, had spars of spruce, with ribs of aluminium alloy. Pilot and instructor sat side-by-side in an enclosed cabin, and were provided with dual controls. 

As FMA was busy building military aircraft production rights were sold to the private firm  but they were unable to start production due to a shortage of materials and equipment as a result of the Second World War. After the end of the war, production rights were re-assigned to Petrolini Hermanos. This company received an order for 160 aircraft from the Argentine government, and commenced deliveries in January 1949.

Operational history
The aircraft, powered by  Continental A65-8 or  Continental A-75 engines, were distributed to Argentina's aeroclubs and to the military, which used it as a spotter and liaison aircraft. Petrolini experienced great difficulties sourcing sufficient materials to complete the order, and in 1951 ceased production, having completed 130 aircraft.

Operators

Argentine Air Force
Argentine Army
Argentine National Gendarmerie

Specifications

See also
 IMPA Tu-Sa
 Tucán T-1

References

 
 Bridgeman, Leonard. Jane's All The World's Aircraft 1950-1951 edition New York: The Mcgraw.Hill Book Company, Inc, 1950 (No ISBN)

External links

1940s Argentine civil utility aircraft
FMA aircraft
Single-engined tractor aircraft
High-wing aircraft
Conventional landing gear
Aircraft first flown in 1940